Milagres Gonsalves (born 24 January 1987) is an Indian footballer who last played for Dempo in the I-League 2nd Division.

Career
Growing up in the then quiet village of Agassim, Milagres had to go through a lot of hardship spending hours travelling to practice every day. His love for football took its roots at the age of 9 when he enrolled himself for a summer coaching camp and from there on he never looked back. While studying in Don Bosco High School in Panaji, Milagres not only excelled in football but also in a variety of disciplines. As years went by, young Milagres realised that football is his calling and after his stints with Don Bosco Oratory and Sao Miguel Taleigao he decided to join Sporting Clube de Goa.

Salgaocar F.C. was his boyhood club and he took his first step towards achieving his dream of playing for them when he moved on from Sporting to join Salgaocar’s U-18 team. The young and energetic Milagres was part of a very successful team that won the U-18 category on two occasions.

Milagres’ impressive performances caught the eye of then Salgaocar coach Mariano Dias and he was soon promoted to the senior team. It was a joyous moment for the then 17-year-old Milagres, who did not lose track of his goal as he kept his feet on the ground and pushed forward. His hunger for success saw him top the goal scorer’s charts in the Goa Professional League in his debut season.

Being an athlete he is very quick on the sprint but he is also good in the air. But the secret weapon is his versatility. Although he prefers to lead the pack playing upfront in the striker’s position but depending or team’s requirement he is ever willing to play in any possible position.

The highlight of his career under the Green colours came in the year 2010-11 when in a span of four months Salgaocar won two prestigious trophies — I-League and Indian Federation Cup.

The Salgaocar boy was proud to be a part of the football contingent that represented Goa in the Lusophony Games held in Macau in 2005.

Career statistics

Club

References

Indian footballers
1987 births
Living people
People from North Goa district
Footballers from Goa
I-League players
Salgaocar FC players
Kerala Blasters FC players
Kerala Blasters FC draft picks
Don Bosco schools alumni
Association football forwards